Ratfucker is the fourth and final studio album by American band Armand Schaubroeck Steals, released in 1978 by record label Mirror.

Reception 

Tiny Mix Tapes called it "arguably the pinnacle of Armand Schaubroeck Steals' short lived career" and "a deranged but brilliant cult classic", while Trouser Press called it "a rough, stunning tour de force".

References

External links 
 

1978 albums